Errol Barnett (born 3 April 1983) is a British-born American anchor and national correspondent for CBS News based in New York City after covering the Trump administration for three years while based in Washington D.C. Barnett also anchored CNN Newsroom during overnight hours in the U.S. and hosted CNN International's cultural affairs program Inside Africa. During his two years at the helm of the award-winning show Barnett reported from half the continent including Senegal, Morocco, Ethiopia, and Madagascar.

Early life
Errol Barnett was born in Milton Keynes, England to Michael Christie and Pamela, an English woman from Liverpool. Gladstone Christie, his Jamaican grandfather, was one of 500 Caribbean aircrew serving with the British Royal Air Force during WWII, afterward relocating to England as part of the Windrush generation. He has one older brother, Danny, and older sister, Natalie, who died. His mother later married Gary Barnett, a US Air Force sergeant who served in the Gulf War before moving the family to Phoenix. Barnett has English, German and Jamaican heritage.

Channel One and UCLA
Barnett attended Garden Lakes Elementary and Westview High School, in Avondale, Arizona, before Channel One News hired him in 2001 relocating to Los Angeles.

The youth oriented Channel One hired Barnett, their youngest anchor/reporter at age 18, to work alongside Maria Menounos, Seth Doane, Gotham Chopra among others. While also taking college classes, Barnett covered Barack Obama's breakout DNC keynote speech, reported from the United Nations when Colin Powell presented flawed WMD intelligence and from the US Capitol during passage of the Homeland Security Act.

Barnett was chosen as one of Teen People magazine's  "20 Teens Who Will Change The World" for his early work. After being accepted to UCLA he left Channel One to complete his undergraduate studies.

At UCLA Barnett received a Bachelor of Arts degree in political science with a focus on international relations. After graduation, in July 2008, Barnett was hired by CNN.

CNN
For CNN Barnett initially reported on the rise in influence of social media and was part of the most viewed streaming event in history during President Obama's Inauguration on CNN.com. In 2010, he anchored a noon eastern news-hour on CNN International from CNN Abu Dhabi focusing on the Arab Spring.

Barnett also hosted the network's longest running feature program called Inside Africa from 2011 to 2014. The weekly half-hour documentary earned awards for its depiction of the continent, with Barnett traveling to and reporting from twenty-two countries in his adventurous self-described "journey of discovery." As a CNN foreign correspondent, he was based in Johannesburg, South Africa covering the death of Nelson Mandela the Oscar Pistorius murder trial and various miner strikes.

Barnett anchored CNN Newsroom while based in Atlanta, Georgia leading coverage of the Ferguson, Missouri protests, death of Robin Williams and the lead up to the 2016 presidential election.

Internet meme
Barnett became the focus of an Internet meme in August, 2014 during CNN's coverage of the Ferguson, Missouri protests. Viewers noted Barnett's response to his co-anchor's suggestion that police use water cannons on demonstrators. Buzzfeed described Barnett's side-eye expression as "did that just happen" and "is this real life?"

CBS News
During the 2016 election, CBS News hired Barnett as a Washington, D.C. based correspondent and anchor appearing on CBS This Morning, the CBS Evening News and on the digital network CBSN. His coverage includes the Presidency of Donald Trump, artificial intelligence, extreme weather and various breaking news events. He also conducts high-interest interviews; his chat with Wikipedia's top editor was viewed two million times and he obtained an exclusive with a woman injured by a zoo jaguar.

Secret Service incident
In October, 2018, the Secret Service issued a rare statement after a viral interaction with Barnett, following the murder of journalist Jamal Khashoggi. As Barnett asked Presidential advisor Jared Kushner about his relationship with the Saudi Crown Prince, Mohammad Bin Salman, a Secret Service agent "physically prevented" Barnett from continuing. As the Washington Post reported, "Barnett can be seen attempting to ask Kushner a question as he makes his way off the plane, before a Secret Service agent appears to block his way. Barnett can then be seen showing his CBS and White House press credentials to one of the agents, who responds, 'I don’t give a damn who you are, there’s a time and a place."

In response to the backlash, the Secret Service said, "the actions were taken solely in response to an abrupt movement by an unknown individual who later identified themselves as a member of the media." On CNN's The Lead with Jake Tapper, Barnett responded "the video speaks for itself".

Other activities
Barnett regularly moderates panel discussions and speaks at conferences on the topics of freedom of the press, U.S. politics and various international issues. Those events have included: Focos Annual Gala, New York (2018), Society of Professional Journalists Annual Awards Dinner, Washington, D.C. (2018); Milken Institute Global Conference, Los Angeles (2017); NABJ/NAHJ Conference, Washington, D.C. (2016); International Press Institute, Johannesburg, South Africa (2014); World Bank Johannesburg, South Africa (2012); and International Press Institute, Vienna, Austria (2010).

References

External links
 Errol Barnett's CNN bio
 Videos of Errol Barnett from CNN.com
 CNN's "Inside Africa" showpage
 
 USA Today article
 Buzzfeed article

American television personalities
Male television personalities
British television newsreaders and news presenters
English television personalities
People from Milton Keynes
University of California, Los Angeles alumni
1983 births
Living people
English emigrants to the United States
American people of Ghanaian descent
Black British television personalities
CNN people
CBS News people